The Eastbourne Academy (shortened to TEA) is a coeducational secondary school with academy status, located in Eastbourne in the English county of East Sussex.

Previously known as Eastbourne Technology College, the school converted to academy status in September 2010. It was previously a community school administered by East Sussex County Council. The school continues to coordinate with East Sussex County Council for admissions.

The Eastbourne Academy offers GCSEs and BTECs as programmes of study for pupils.

References

External links
The Eastbourne Academy official website

Secondary schools in East Sussex
Academies in East Sussex